Tatumbla is a municipality in the Honduran department of Francisco Morazán.

Tatumbla is located in the mountains above Tegucigalpa, about a 45-minute bus ride. Tatumbla has a website under Tatumbla.com. 

Municipalities of the Francisco Morazán Department